"Dive into Yourself" is a single released by High and Mighty Color on July 26, 2006

Overview
"Dive into Yourself" is the band's seventh single and the first after the release of their second album Gou on Progressive. "Dive into Yourself" was used as an advertisement theme for the PlayStation 2 game Sengoku Basara 2 and Sengoku Basara 2 Heroes, while the B-side "Flying Music" was used as the theme song for Harmony with the Earth ID. Included on the single was a paper form that allowed one to enter a contest when filled out and mailed in. The winner of the contest won the prize of having their voice recorded and added to the album version of "Dive into Yourself" (see San). The first press edition of the single came with a wristband selected from a variety of colors. The hook-line is a cover from 2 Unlimited - "Twilight Zone" from 1992.

Sample of the translated lyrics:
Wow...!
I'll break through the clouds
That hang over the sky as it moves
Wow...!
And become a wind
That blows everywhere

Music video
The music video for "Dive into Yourself" first aired on MTV Japan, and was directed by Tomoo Noda. It immediately starts off with the band bouncing around in a garage-like setting, each member playing his or her respective instruments and/or singing. Large lights and screens surround them, and photographers and camera men can be seen taking photos and recording them. Just before the second chorus, Maki starts to walk away from the other band members, all the while, the cord to her microphone uncoiling until it's almost coming out of the socket. Yuusuke finally pulls the cord, forcing the microphone out of Maki's hands, and back to the other members. Maki quickly runs back and grabs the microphone from the ground just in time to sing the chorus after the instrumental break. The video finally ends with Maki yelling, "Perfect!"

Track list
 "Dive into Yourself" – 3:48
  – 3:44
 "Haitoku no Jounetsu ~Urgent Immoral Passion Mix~" (remixed by 1.DT of Nat) – 5:08
 "Dive into Yourself (Less Vocal Track)" - 3:46

All songs written by High and Mighty Color.

Personnel
 Maakii & Yuusuke — vocals
 Kazuto — guitar
 Meg — guitar
 Mackaz — bass
 Sassy — drums

Production
 Through – art direction & design
 Hidekazu Maiyama – photographer
 Tsukushi Ichikawa (Mild) – hair & make-up
 Toshio Takeda (Mild) – styling

TV performances
 July, 2006 - Music Express

Charts
Oricon Sales Chart (Japan)

References 

2006 singles
High and Mighty Color songs